The 2008 Latvian Individual Speedway Championship was the 34th Latvian Individual Speedway Championship season. The final took place on 13 July 2008 in Daugavpils, Latvia.

Results
 July 13, 2008
  Daugavpils

Speedway in Latvia
2008 in Latvian sport
2008 in speedway